The 2009 Geelong Football Club season was the club's 110th season in the Australian Football League (AFL). Geelong won the 2009 NAB Cup, their third night series/pre-season premiership, defeating  by 76 points, and finished the regular season in second position on the ladder, resulting in qualification for the 2009 AFL finals series. Geelong's regular season record (18 wins, four losses) was the first time a team had won 18 or more matches in the VFL/AFL's regular season for three consecutive seasons (2007, 2008, 2009). Geelong then proceeded to win its qualifying and preliminary finals in succession to earn a place in the 2009 AFL Grand Final against the minor premiers . Geelong won the 2009 Grand Final over St Kilda by 80 points to 68.

Club list

Changes from 2008 list

Additions
 Exchange period – received:
None
 Rookie elevation:
None
 Father/son selection:
None
 NAB AFL Draft (29 November 2008):
 Mitchell Brown (Round 1; Overall pick 15; from Geelong Falcons)
 Thomas Gillies (Round 2; Overall pick 33; from Dandenong Stringrays)
 Steven Motlop (Round 3; Overall pick 39; from Wanderers)
 Taylor Hunt (Round 3; Overall pick 49; from Sandringham Dragons)

 NAB AFL Pre-Season Draft (16 December 2008):
None
 NAB AFL Rookie Draft (16 December 2008):
 Adam Varcoe (Round 1; Overall pick 15; from Central District)
 Bryn Weadon (Round 2; Overall pick 31; from North Ballarat Rebels)
 Tom Allwright (Round 3; Overall pick 46; from North Hobart Demons)
 Ranga Ediriwickrama (Round 4; Overall pick 60; via NSW AFL scholarship program)

Deletions
 Exchange period – traded:

 Delisted:
 Liam Bedford (from Rookie list)
 Jason Davenport
 Chris Kangars (from Rookie list)

 Retirements:
 Nathan Ablett

Playing list

Rookie list
 Players are listed in alphabetical order by surname, and statistics are for AFL regular season and finals series matches during the 2009 AFL season only. Statistics are correct to the end of the 2009 season (26 September 2009).

 * Nominated rookie (Elevated to senior list during season, eligible for senior selection)

Season summary

NAB Cup

Regular season

Finals

Ladder

Awards and records
 Milestones

 AFL awards

 Club awards

 Other honours

 Records
 First, and only, time a club has won 18 or more matches in three consecutive VFL/AFL seasons (2007, 2008, 2009).
 Most times a player has been awarded the Leigh Matthews Trophy as the AFLPA's Most Valuable Player – Gary Ablett, Jr. (three times; 2007, 2008, 2009).
 Highest number of disposals in a single VFL/AFL match – Gary Ablett, Jr. in round four against  (46 disposals; tied with Nathan Buckley).
 Highest number of handpasses in a single VFL/AFL match – Gary Ablett, Jr. in round four against  (33 handpasses).

Notes
Key

 H ^ Home match.
 A ^ Away match.

General notes

References

External links
 Official website of the Geelong Football Club
 Official website of the Australian Football League 
 2009 season scores and results at AFL Tables
 2009 Geelong player statistics at AFL Tables

Geelong Football Club Season, 2009
Geelong Football Club seasons
Geelong Football Club Season, 2009